Dominik Czaja (born 12 August 1995) is a Polish rower.

He won a medal at the 2019 World Rowing Championships.

References

External links

1995 births
Living people
Polish male rowers
World Rowing Championships medalists for Poland
Olympic rowers of Poland
Rowers at the 2020 Summer Olympics
European Rowing Championships medalists
21st-century Polish people